Adel Mojallali Moghaddam (born 21 March 1993) is an Iranian canoeist. He competed in the men's C-1 200 metres event at the 2016 Summer Olympics.

He won a bronze medal at the 2017 ICF Canoe Sprint World Championships becoming the first ever Iranian canoeist to win a medal at the ICF Canoe Sprint World Championships.

References

External links
 

1993 births
Living people
Iranian male canoeists
Olympic canoeists of Iran
Canoeists at the 2016 Summer Olympics
Asian Games bronze medalists for Iran
Asian Games medalists in canoeing
Canoeists at the 2014 Asian Games
Medalists at the 2014 Asian Games
People from Golestan Province
ICF Canoe Sprint World Championships medalists in Canadian
Canoeists at the 2018 Asian Games